Kadri Baba Jubril (born 18 January 1990) is a Nigerian professional basketball coach and former player. He is the current head coach of the Kwara Falcons of the Basketball Africa League (BAL) and the Nigerian Premier League.

Playing career 
Jubril competed with the Nigeria Under-19 team at the 1999 FIBA Under-19 World Championship, where he averaged 15 points and 2.9 rebounds per game. During his professional career, he played for the Kwara Falcons (where he was the captain), Ebun Comets and the Nigeria Customs in the 2013 FIBA Africa Clubs Champions Cup.

Coaching career 
Since 2023, Jubril is also an assistant coach for the Nigeria national men's team. In 2018, Jubril started as assistant coach with the Kwara Falcons, under Lateef Erinfolami. Since assuming the position a year later, Jubril has been the head coach of Kwara Falcons. He guided the team to their first-ever Premier League title in 2022. As a result, he will coach the Falcons in their debut season in Season 3 of the Basketball Africa League (BAL).

References 

Nigerian men's basketball players
1990 births
Kwara Falcons players
Nigerian basketball coaches
People from Ilorin
Living people